The 2018–19 Moldovan Women's Cup was the 22nd season of the Moldovan annual football tournament. The competition started on 17 October 2018 and concluded with the final held on 2 June 2019. A total of nine teams had their entries to the tournament.

Preliminary round

Quarter-finals

First legs

Second legs

Semi-finals

First legs

Second legs

Final

The final was played on 2 June 2019 at the Municipal Stadium in Hîncești.

References

Moldovan Women's Cup seasons
Moldovan Women's Cup 2018-19
Moldova